Madalitso may refer to:

 Madalitso Muthiya (born 1983), Zambian golfer
 Madalitso Mkoloma (born 1985), Barbudan soccer player
 Madalitso Food Production, a Malawaian company owned by Napoleon Dzombe
 Madalitso (album), a 2018 album by Edith WeUtonga
 HD 85390 b (planet), Star Natasha, Constellation Vela; an exoplanet named after the Zambian Nyanja-language term for blessings

See also